Ceroxys laticornis is a species of ulidiid or picture-winged fly in the genus Ceroxys of the family Ulidiidae.

Distribution
Ceroxys laticornis is found in Russia and northeastern China.

References

laticornis
Insects described in 1873